Vikramavardhana (Javanese : ꦮꦶꦑꦿꦩꦮꦂꦝꦟ)
(Indonesian : Wikramawardhana) was a Javanese emperor and succeeded Hayam Wuruk as the fifth monarch of the Majapahit empire, reigning from 1389 to 1429.

Early life 
He was the nephew and also the son-in-law of the previous monarch, King Rajasanagara Dyah Hayam Vuruk. Her mother was the king's sister, Princess Isvari, the Duchess of Pajang who married Shri Singhavardhana, Duke of Paguhan. He had a younger sister, Suravardhani or Rajasavardhani who became Duchess of Panavan-avan, and later changed to Duchess of Panavuhan. Himself brought the title of Bhre Mataram or "the Duke of Mataram".

He was arranged to marry his cousin, Crown Princess Kusumavardhani, the Duchess of Kabalan who was born from the Queen Shri Sudevi. He was no older than 12 and she was no older than 7 at that time. She became his primary consort upon their marriage.

Regreg War 
A succession conflicts rose following the death of the former Queen Tribhuvana and her sister Rajadevi. Rajadevi's husband, Vijayarajasa carried out a separatist action by proclaimed himself as new king with the regnal name Bhatara Parameswara ring Pamotan, at Kedhaton Wetan "the Eastern Court" while Hayam Vuruk still reigned in Kedhaton Kulon "the Western Court" until his death. Hayam Vuruk reclutanted to fight Vijayarajasa, as he was his aunt's husband and the father of Queen Shri Sudevi.

After the death of Hayam Vuruk and Vijayarajasa the conflict even became worst. Vikramavardhana took the throne with Kusumavardhani being successor of Hayam Vuruk, while another side, the 2nd Bhre Virabhumi who was Hayam Vuruk's son and Vijayarajasa's grandson-in-law proclaimed himself as the heir at Kedhaton Wetan. 

His co-reign with Queen Kusumavardhani was challenged by Bhre Virabhumi. Bhre Virabhumi felt that he had a better right to be successor since he was the only son of the late monarch. However Bhre Virabhumi lacked legitimacy because his mother was a concubine, while Vikramavardhana's wife, was born from the Queen Mother Shri Sudevi.

Later, he gave the title Bhre Lasem or "Duchess of Lasem" to Kusumavardhani who previously Duchess of Kabalan when her father was alive. Whereas, Bhre Wirabhumi 's wife namely Nagaravardhani bore title  the Duchess of Lasem earlier than her. So there were two Duchess of Lasem during Kedhaton Kulon and Kedhaton Wetan period, both of them were the new ruler's queen consort. Kusumavardhani, Bhre Lasem Sang Ahayu or "the Fair Duchess of Lasem" and Nagaravardhani, Bhre Lasem Sang Alemu or "the Fat Duchess of Lasem". This showed that Vikramavardhana's strongly opposed Bhre Virabhumi 's claim as the new monarch of Majapahit and tried to show his political power.

In 1398, Majapahit under the rule of Vikramavardhana sent their navy to invade Kingdom of Singapura. Their last king, Iskandar Shah or Paramesvara fled to north. This invasion was successful.

Both Queen Kusumavardhani of Kedhaton Kulon and Nagaravardhani of Kedhaton Wetan died in 1400. Then, Vikramavardhana gave title the 4th Duchess of Lasem to his daughter-in-law who married the 2nd Duke of Tumapel.

The struggle for succession between Vikramavardhana and Bhre Virabhumi was never resolved. It seemed to have gotten worse after the death of their beloved queen. Both kings had good relationship with Chinese, even they received envoys separately. Admiral Cheng Ho of Ming dynasty was recorded as visiting Java in 1405. The outbreak of Regreg War in 1406 accidentally killed Chinese envoys in Kedhaton Wetan. Despite Vikramavardhana's success in winning the war and defeating Bhre Virabhumi, the civil war gravely weakened  previously unchallenged Majapahit hegemony in Nusantara and loosened Majapahit's grip on its far flung vassal kingdoms. 

Wikramawardhana ruled until 1429, and was succeeded by his daughter, Suhita.

Personal life 
His queen consort was the former Crown Princess Kusumavardhani, the daughter of King Rajasanagara Dyah Hayam Vuruk and Queen Shri Sudevi. She gave birth to Crown Prince Rajasakusuma, the 2nd Duke of Mataram who died in 1399. Vikramavardhana gave him posthumous title Hyang Vekasing Sukha.

Vikramavardhana's second child was the 2nd Duke of Tumapel and then Crown Prince until his death in 1427.

One of his concubine maybe was his niece, the 3rd Duchess of Mataram, the daughter of Suravardhani and Ranamanggala. She was probably the mother of the 2nd Duke of Tumapel who held the Crown Prince position after the death of Rajasakusuma but died before ascending the throne.

He also took Bhre Virabhumi 's daughter as concubine after Regreg War. She was the 4th Duchess of Daha and probably the mother of the future Queen Suhita and King Kertavijaya.

Ancestry

References

 Pringle, Robert. A Short History of Bali: Indonesia's Hindu Realm. Crows Nest, NSW: Allan & Unwin, 2004.

Kings of Majapahit
Indonesian Hindu monarchs
Javanese monarchs
14th-century monarchs in Asia
15th-century monarchs in Asia
14th-century Indonesian people
15th-century Indonesian people
14th-century Hindus